The Funky Phantom is an animated television series, produced by Hanna-Barbera Productions, in association with Australian production company Air Programs International for the American Broadcasting Company (ABC). The show was a clone of Hanna-Barbera's popular Scooby-Doo, Where Are You!, with a trio of teenage detectives driving around the country and solving crimes. In this case, the "Scooby-Doo" role was taken by a Revolutionary War-era ghost.

The show returned briefly in reruns in 1980, as part of Hanna-Barbera's Godzilla series.

Plot
Trying to find shelter from a storm while driving their "Looney Duney" dune buggy, three teenagers — the brainy redhead Skip Gilroy, the beautiful blonde April Stewart, and Skip's brawny dark-haired best friend, Augie Anderson — and his dog Elmo, entered an old house where a grandfather clock displayed the incorrect time. Upon setting the clock to midnight, it released two Revolutionary War-era ghosts: an American patriot named Jonathan Wellington Muddlemore, whom the kids call "Mudsy", and his cat, whom he had trained to respond to the name of Boo. The two explained that, during the Revolutionary War, they had stumbled upon two Redcoats and ended up hiding inside the clock, but also that they then were unable to get out of the clock and eventually died inside. Ever since being freed by their new friends, Mudsy and Boo have accompanied them on many mysteries, always giving an invisible helping hand.

This set-up shows a certain similarity to the 1946 Abbott and Costello film The Time of Their Lives, in which two Revolutionary War-era ghosts are also held earth-bound due to a secret hidden in a clock.

Production
The character voice of Mudsy was provided by Daws Butler and was identical to his voice work for Snagglepuss, down to the use of Snagglepuss's catchphrase, "...even". Butler's Snagglepuss voice was originally an impersonation of comedian Bert Lahr.

Like many animated series created by Hanna-Barbera in the 1970s, the show contained a studio-created laugh track, and indeed, it was one of the first such productions to do so. Syndicated versions, on Cartoon Network and Boomerang have the track muted.

Cast

Main
 Daws Butler as Jonathan Wellington "Mudsy" Muddlemore, Fingers (in "Pigskin Predicament")
 Tommy Cook as "Augie" Anderson
 Micky Dolenz as Skip Gilroy
 Kristina Holland as April Stewart
 Don Messick as Elmo the Dog, Boo the Cat, Farmer Higgins (in "Don't Fool with a Phantom"), Raven/Otis Carter (in "Don't Fool with a Pahntom"), Chickenman/Mr. Angus (in "Who's Chicken"), Ichabod Crane (in "The Headless Horseman"), Mayor (in "We Saw a Sea Serpent"), Packy (in "We Saw a Sea Serpent"), Ghost/Bill Sands (in "Haunt in Inn"), Hotel Guest (in "Haunt in Inn"), Lifeguard (in "Haunted in Inn"), Spirit of '76/Hank Miller (in "Mudsy and Muddlemore Manor")

Additional voices
 Julie Bennett as Lori Elwood (in "The Headless Horseman")
 Jerry Dexter as Richard (in "The Headless Horseman")
 Casey Kasem as Professor Lundgren (In "Spirit Spooked"), Winfield Wheely (in "April's Foolish Day")
 Jim MacGeorge as
 Allan Melvin as Mayor (in "Mudsy and Muddlemore Manor")
 Barney Phillips as
 Mike Road as Henchman (in "I'll Haunt You Later")
 Hal Smith as Houndman/Barkley (in "The Hairy Scary Houndsman")
 John Stephenson as Ghost of Jean Lafitte/Malcolm Rogers (in "I'll Haunt You Later"), Headless Horseman (in "The Headless Horseman"), Gas Station Attendant (in "We Saw a Sea Serpent"), Black Lake Creature (in "We Saw a Sea Serpent"), Mr. Warnock (in "We Saw a Sea Serpent"), Hugo (in "Haunt in Inn"), Ghost of Widow Wilson's Inn (in "Haunt in Inn"), Parafiend (in "The Liberty Bell Caper"), Slippery Stark (in "Ghost Grabbers")
 George Tyler
 Janet Waldo as Widow Wilson (in "Haunt in Inn")

Episodes

Home media
On October 26, 2010, Warner Archive released The Funky Phantom: The Complete Series on DVD in region 1 as part of their Hanna-Barbera Classics Collection. This is a Manufacture-on-Demand (MOD) release, available exclusively through Warner's online store and Amazon.com. The series is also available in Digital media format at iTunes Store for Apple.

Comics
In the 1970s, comic books of The Funky Phantom were released by Western Publishing and Gold Key Comics. The comics were both original stories as well as adaptations of some of the TV episodes. The stories in the comics, however, took a different turn from the TV episodes. While on the show, the "ghost" was always a villain in a mask (like Scooby-Doo), in some of the original comic stories, the villains would often turn out to be other ghosts from on or around the colonial era (the show never addressed why it seemed that there were no other ghosts besides Mudsy and Boo). The comics even did a twist on the series when the gang traveled back to colonial times via an erratic time machine, only to find out that the kids are now the ghosts (the machine could only transport spiritual matter) and Mudsy is once more inside his original flesh-and-blood body. Also, the comics introduced a new regular character who never appeared in the show. Priscilla Atwater, a ghostly matron from Mudsy's time, who lusted after Mudsy and pursued him actively, although she tended to flirt with just about any other ghost who happened to come along.

In 2018, the Phantom appeared in a backup story in the DC comic Black Lightning/Hong Kong Phooey Special #1; in this story, Jason Blood conjures Muddlemore's ghost so that some reporters and citizens can ask Mudsy what he thinks about the Second Amendment.

Other appearances
 Mudsy appeared with Boo in the Harvey Birdman, Attorney at Law episode "High Speed Buggy Chase", where he was voiced by Chris Edgerly. The question "What makes the Funky Phantom so funky?" is finally asked and answered.
 Mudsy and his friends appear in the Scooby-Doo! Mystery Incorporated episode "Mystery Solvers Club State Finals" with Mudsy voiced by Tom Kenny and Boo voiced by Rick D. Wasserman. He and his team appear alongside other Hanna-Barbera mystery teams (consisting of Mystery Inc., Jabberjaw, Speed Buggy, and Captain Caveman and the Teen Angels) in a fever dream of Scooby-Doo's. When the teenage sleuths are kidnapped by a flaming skeletal spirit called Lord Infernicus (also voiced by Rick D. Wasserman), the sidekicks are left to solve the mystery. Mudsy believes Scooby cannot solve the case. It is revealed that Mudsy is the true culprit and not a real ghost, but a down-on-his-luck actor who joined a team of teen sleuths who mistook him for a real ghost. Tired of being reduced to sidekick status, he kidnapped the teenage sleuths so he could become the hero instead of a sidekick and send the kids to Africa, which was in desperate need of teen mystery solvers in his eyes. Boo then states "You lied to me" and attacks Mudsy. When Scooby wakes up, he finds that the State Finals have been moved to next week with the chairman that arrived having a strange resemblance to Mudsy. Of course, since this was just a dream and the fact that this is Scooby-Doo! Mystery Incorporated, this is not canon to the actual Funky Phantom show, let alone any other Hanna-Barbera series.
 Mudsy appeared in the MAD segment "ParaMorgan", where he was shown with other popular fictional ghosts.
 The second episode of Scooby-Doo and Guess Who? titled "A Mystery Solving Gang Divided" is a crossover with this series, with Mudsy once again voiced by Kenny who also voices Augie, now joined by Billy West as Skip and Kate Micucci as April. The group meets Mystery Inc. when it comes to a mystery involving the ghost of a Civil War sergeant. In order to get both groups to work together, Mudsy poses as the Ghost of Abraham Lincoln (voiced by John DiMaggio). A running gag in this episode is that Velma keeps asking Skip, Augie, and April what holographic technology they are using to pull off Mudsy's appearance.
 Mudsy and Boo both appear in the HBO Max original series Jellystone! with Mudsy voiced by Paul F. Tompkins. Mudsy's voice in Jellystone! is more unique sounding so that he would not sound similar to Bert Lahr. He is portrayed as an ex-world famous wrestler, forced to retire after using his ghostly powers against his opponents like he did when he possessed his opponent Mightor, now working as the spokesman for an avocado arrangement business. Mayor Huckleberry Hound arranged a wrestling event commentated by Snagglepuss and Mildew Wolf where the citizens in their wrestling name went up against each other to determine who would face off against the Funky Phantom. This lasted until Yogi in his wrestler name of Dr. Pain remained. The Funky Phantom uses his ghostly abilities on Dr. Pain causing Mayor Huckleberry to recall what happened in the Funky Phantom's infamous match and join the fight as the "Avocadog". He rallied the defeated wrestlers to help defeat the Funky Phantom. While the Funky Phantom apologized to Mayor Huckleberry for his misuse of his ghostly abilities, police chief Touché Turtle prepared to arrest the Funky Phantom for misusing his ghostly abilities causing the Funky Phantom to possess him. In "Jailcation", the Funky Phantom was shown to be an inmate at Santo Relaxo.

References

External links
 
 The Funky Phantom at the Big Cartoon DataBase
 The Funky Phantom at Toonarific.com

1970s American animated television series
1971 American television series debuts
1972 American television series endings
1970s Australian animated television series
1971 Australian television series debuts
1972 Australian television series endings
Australian children's animated adventure television series
Australian children's animated comedy television series
Australian children's animated mystery television series
American children's animated adventure television series
American children's animated comedy television series
American children's animated horror television series
American children's animated mystery television series
English-language television shows
Teen animated television series
Television series by Hanna-Barbera
Animated television series about monsters
Animated television series about ghosts